Safe Passage or Camino Seguro is a non-profit organization that provides school enrollment and after-school support for poor children whose families scavenge the Guatemala City Garbage Dump in Guatemala City. Safe Passage was founded in 1999 by the late Hanley Denning. The organization assists over 550 children.

History
Safe Passage was founded in 1999 by the late Hanley Denning, a teacher from Maine who traveled to Guatemala to learn Spanish. While she was there, the woman with whom she was lodging told her that she wanted her to see the Guatemala City Garbage Dump. After seeing this, Hanley called home and asked her parents to sell her car, computer, and other belongings so that she could start a program to help the people of the dump. With around $5,000, she started a drop-in program in a church outside of the dump. Approximately 40 children showed up in the first week. People gave her a hard time at first, because others had tried to help them but given up. She persevered and about six months later gained people's confidence. Denning was killed on January 18, 2007, aged 36, when a bus with no brakes collided head-on with the car she was riding in. Her driver, a Guatemala native, was also killed. Two volunteers riding in the back seat of the car were injured. She was known by some as "El Angel del Basurero" or "The Angel of the Garbage Dump". One of Safe Passage's most recent additions is the Early Childhood Education, program also known as the Escuelita, which hosts children from ages two through six, enhancing their health and school readiness, and ensuring the well-being of these children while their parents work.

Mission
Safe Passage works to "combat poverty through education". The families of Safe Passage children scavenge through the Guatemala City Dump for items to resell. The organization works to enroll these children in the public schools. The public schools are technically free, but students must provide their own books, supplies, and uniforms, at a cost that is prohibitive for these poor people. The school day in Guatemala runs a half-day, so Safe Passage runs a support program for the other half of the day. Students come to Safe Passage for the half of the day that they are not in school. There they are separated by class level and do activities that reinforce what they are learning school. They receive a snack and lunch. If students miss less than three days of school a month and less than three days at the program, their family receives a food bag, with the equivalent of what money the child would likely have earned if not in school.

Fundraising
Safe Passage relies on child sponsorships to keep the program running, and many fundraisers have been held across the country. In November  2006, a fund raiser "Unmasking the Truth" was held at the Children's Museum of Maine, and an event called "La Fiesta" was held in Michigan.  A school-supply drive in Maine was organized in December 2006. Many high schools have also held fund raisers for Safe Passage. Events include bottle and coin drives, school dances, badminton tournaments, bake sales, and presentations. In 2005, a 5k roadrace was organized in Cumberland, Maine, to benefit Safe Passage. The third annual was held on April 28, 2007. Over $22,000 has already been raised through this race.

Volunteering
Many support teams go to Safe Passage during the school breaks.  For example, this year a group of Bowdoin students traveled to Guatemala for their alternative spring break. There are also opportunities to travel to Guatemala as a long-term volunteer.  These people stay for a minimum of five weeks, and many of them tend to stay longer.  They can live with a host family, stay in a hostel, or live in their own apartment, in Antigua. The volunteers are picked up every day by a bus that takes them to Safe Passage in Guatemala City. Long-term volunteers work in the classroom, assisting teachers and students in the classroom. Volunteers also work in the offices located in Yarmouth.
Another way to volunteer is becoming an Ambassador for Safe Passage. Ambassadors raise awareness and money for Safe Passage through different activities. Becoming an Ambassador is a great way to continue your support of Safe Passage after going to Guatemala as a part of a support team.

Hanley Denning
Hanley Graham Denning (March 9, 1970 – January 18, 2007) was the founder of Safe Passage. Born in Yarmouth, Maine, Denning graduated from Cumberland Center's Greely High School in 1988 and began attending Bowdoin College in Brunswick. She graduated from Bowdoin in 1992 with a degree in Psychology. After graduating from Bowdoin, she received her master's degree in Education at Wheelock College. After graduating from Wheelock, she began her career as a social worker in North Carolina. Many of Denning's students were Spanish-speaking, leaving her frustrated because she had difficulty understanding them.

In 1997, with the hopes of being able to improve her Spanish, Denning traveled to Guatemala to volunteer and visited a Guatemala City garbage dump. At the dump, children were digging through the piles of trash looking for anything they could eat, sell, or use for shelter. None of these kids were going to school because they could not afford the uniforms, supplies, and other miscellaneous costs. Denning sold her car and laptop and used the money to open Safe Passage in a nearby church. Eventually, Safe Passage moved to a safer location. In 2007, First Lady Laura Bush visited Safe Passage and recognized Denning's efforts.

On January 18, 2007, aged 36, Denning was killed in a car accident when the vehicle in which she was riding outside Guatemala City was hit head-on by a bus with no brakes. Denning received commendations from the United States Senate and Maine State Senate for her work with the children and families of the Guatemala City garbage dump.

Recycled Life documentary film
The Academy-Award nominated short documentary Recycled Life by Leslie Iwerks and Mike Glad focuses on the lives of those who work in the Guatemala City garbage dump. Denning appeared briefly as herself in the film, and the DVD includes a special video tribute to her. The documentary was shown on HBO in late 2007.

References

Charities based in Maine
Children's charities based in the United States
Educational charities
Foreign charities operating in Guatemala